"Hazard" is a song written, produced, and performed by American singer-songwriter Richard Marx. The song is about a woman named Mary who mysteriously disappears and a social pariah who is accused of orchestrating Mary's disappearance, despite claiming to be innocent. The song's music video follows this plot. "Hazard" was released as the second single from Marx's third studio album, Rush Street (1991), on January 28, 1992, in the United States.

In April 1992, "Hazard" peaked at  9 on the US Billboard Hot 100 and shortly thereafter topped the Billboard Adult Contemporary chart, becoming Marx's third number-one single on that chart. Internationally, "Hazard" reached No. 1 in Australia, the top three in Canada, Ireland, and the United Kingdom, and the top 10 in New Zealand, Norway, and Sweden.

Song overview
"Hazard" tells the story of a relationship of some kind between the narrator and a woman named Mary. Mary disappears in suspicious circumstances, and the narrator, already shunned by many in the small village where he has lived since the age of seven ("That boy's not right"), is immediately considered the main suspect. However, the narrator maintains his innocence throughout the song, and the matter of culpability is left open to the listener's interpretation.

Liking the lyric "this old Nebraska town", Richard Marx wrote to the Nebraska Chamber of Commerce, asking for a list of Nebraska towns with two syllables, finding Hazard ideal for its double meaning. (The lyrics refer to a river; the real Hazard does not possess one, although there is a muddy creek.) Locals invited Marx to be Grand Marshal at Sherman County's Fourth of July parade in 1993, which he accepted.

Marx considered it a "stupid song that no one would pay attention to" and only recorded it to prove his wife wrong, who had told him it was going to be a huge hit song.

Music video

Overview
The music video for "Hazard", directed by Michael Haussman, reveals additional video cues and other details that led viewers to speculate about the question of the protagonist's innocence while still following the song's lyrics and ultimately leaving the outcome open to interpretation. The narrator also refers to the state of Nebraska, United States, and specifically a village in that state called Hazard. "Mary" is played by actress Renee Parent. The Sheriff is played by actor Robert Conrad.

Video synopsis
The music video opens with the protagonist cutting his hair by the side of a creek. Suddenly the ghost of a woman is seen hovering over the creek. Several older men are seen teasing the protagonist as a child with his mother in the background. Mary is depicted as having features very similar to those of the protagonist's mother. The town's sheriff is shown taking photographs of the couple and following one or both of them in his vehicle.

The protagonist goes to see Mary but catches her making love to an unidentified person as the police car arrives. He remembers a time in his childhood when he sees his mother committing adultery. In present time, the protagonist flees the scene, leaving his scarf behind.

Mary is at the river, with a look of surprise on her face, then she appears to be lying in water. The next morning several people assist in arresting the male character in connection with her disappearance.

While in the interrogation room, the protagonist is shown a white cloth, which the sheriff identifies as the item used to strangle Mary. He then denies that he and Mary were romantically involved. He remembers himself as a child seeing his father leave his mother for another woman. He remembers running out of a burning house.

Locals are shown vandalizing the male character's home, breaking its windows and setting fire. He cannot be proved guilty so the sheriff drops him off at his ruined home. A woman walking by covers her young son's eyes. The protagonist leaves town by hitchhiking. He remembers the girl saying to him: "You know, everyone says that I should be afraid of you. But I am not."

Track listings

US, Canadian, and Australasian cassette single
 "Hazard"
 "Big Boy Now"

US and European CD single
 "Hazard" – 5:17
 "Thunder and Lightning" – 4:48
 "Ride with the Idol" – 3:42

Australasian CD single
 "Hazard" (album version) – 5:17
 "Should've Known Better" (live) – 5:18
 "Endless Summer Nights" (live) – 5:28
 "Right Here Waiting" (live) – 4:52

UK 7-inch and cassette single
 "Hazard" (edit) – 4:45
 "Right Here Waiting" (LP version) – 4:23

UK CD1
 "Hazard" (LP version)
 "Right Here Waiting" (LP version)
 "Too Late to Say Goodbye"
 "Edge of a Broken Heart"

UK CD2
 "Hazard" (edit)
 "Keep Coming Back" (quiet storm mix)
 "Thunder and Lightning"
 "Endless Summer Nights" (LP version)

Personnel
 Richard Marx – lead and backing vocals 
 Michael Egizi – keyboards, programming 
 Bruce Gaitsch – acoustic guitar 
 Chris Trujillo – percussion

Charts

Weekly charts

Year-end charts

Certifications

Release history

References

1991 songs
1992 singles
Black-and-white music videos
Capitol Records singles
Music videos directed by Michael Haussman
Nebraska in fiction
Number-one singles in Australia
Richard Marx songs
Songs about death
Songs written by Richard Marx